was a public junior college in Kyoto, Kyoto, Japan, established in 1954. The predecessor of the school was founded in 1950. Discontinued in 2013.

External links
 Official website 

Educational institutions established in 1954
Public universities in Japan
Universities and colleges in Kyoto Prefecture
Japanese junior colleges
1954 establishments in Japan